The women's shot put competition at the 2006 Asian Games in Doha, Qatar was held on 9 December 2006 at the Khalifa International Stadium.

Schedule
All times are Arabia Standard Time (UTC+03:00)

Records

Results

References

External links 
Results

Athletics at the 2006 Asian Games
2006